Statistics of Primera Fuerza in season 1904–05.

Overview
Pachuca won the Mexican national championship for the first time in 1905, if only because their goal average (goal ratio) was better than that of British Club (Mexico City). A Mexican triumph this was not, however, as all of Pachuca's players were British, many of whom had gained experience playing in the English leagues. The champions' line-up included the three brothers "Stan", "Charly" and "Jack" Dawe, as well as outside right "Willie" Rule and wing half-back "Jack" Rabling. Goalkeeper Charles Quickmore was a priest and minister of the Protestant mine churches in Mexico. Orizaba, Mexican champions in 1903, could no longer play in the league as the travels involved would have been too long and would have taken too much time.

League standings

Top goalscorers
Players sorted first by goals scored, then by last name.

References

Mexico - List of final tables (RSSSF)

1904-05
Mex
1904–05 in Mexican football